The Chicago Maroons were a minor league baseball team based in Chicago, Illinois in 1888. The Chicago Maroons played as members of the Class A level Western Association. Financial issues caused the team to fold after a 6th place season in 1888. The Maroons played minor league home games at West Side Park.

History
In 1888, the Chicago Maroons began minor league play as members of the eight–team Class A level Western Association. In the era, Class A was the highest level of minor league baseball. The Maroons began 1888 play with the Des Moines Prohibitionists, Kansas City Blues, Milwaukee Brewers, Minneapolis Millers, Omaha Omahogs, St. Paul Apostles and St. Louis Whites joining Chicago in Western Association play.

The president of the Chicago Maroons was Sam Morton, who also was serving a dual role as president of the Western Association in 1888.

The Chicago Maroons began Western Association play on April 28, 1888. The Maroons finished the season in 6th place, playing under player/manager Moxie Hengel, who led the team with 5 home runs. With a record of 47–71, Chicago finished 32.0 games behind the 1st place Kansas City Blues in the final 1888 standings. The Maroons were led on the mound by Frank Dwyer, who won 19 games, pitching 322 innings with a 2.52 ERA and 35 complete games.

The Maroons were put up for sale after compiling a debt of $4,000, but the difficulty of having a minor league team playing in a major league city was not attractive to prospective buyers. In August, 1888 the Chicago franchise was close to moving to Minneapolis, Minnesota for $5,000 after the Minneapolis Millers moved to become the Davenport Onion Weeders, but the deal fell through. The Chicago Maroons permanently folded after the 1888 season and did not return to play in the 1889 Western Association.

The ballpark
The 1888 Chicago Maroons reportedly played their home games at West Side Park. The park also served as the home ballpark for the Chicago Cubs (then called the White Stockings). West Side Park had a capacity of 10,300, with field dimensions of (Left, Center, Right): 216–520–216. The site of the ballpark is now occupied by the Andrew Jackson Language Academy. The location today is 1340 West Harrison, Chicago, Illinois.

Year–by–year record

Notable alumni

Charlie Cady (1888)
Dad Clarkson (1888)
Roscoe Coughlin (1888)
Dan Dugdale (1888)
Frank Dwyer (1888)
Pete Galligan (1888)
Moxie Hengel (1888, MGR)
Charlie Hoover (1888)
Charlie Ingraham (1888)
Herman Long (1888)
Jim McCauley (1888)
Gene Moriarty (1888)
Chick Pedroes (1888)
George Rooks (1888)
Jumbo Schoeneck (1888)
Milt Scott (1888)
Charlie Sprague (1888)

See also
Chicago Maroons players

References

External links
Baseball Reference

Defunct minor league baseball teams
Professional baseball teams in Illinois
Defunct baseball teams in Illinois
Baseball teams established in 1888
Baseball teams disestablished in 1888
Defunct Western Association teams
Defunct baseball teams in Chicago